Kevin C. Conroy (born April 23, 1960) is an American media, entertainment, and technology executive. He has held senior roles at AOL, Univision and MGM.

Early life and education 
Kevin C. Conroy was born on April 23, 1960 in Providence, Rhode Island. He graduated from LaSalle Academy High School in 1978 and received a B.A. in Government and Legal Studies from Bowdoin College in Brunswick, Maine.

Career 
Conroy started his career at Leonard Monahan Inc, in his hometown of Providence, Rhode Island in 1984.  As vice president, he managed new business efforts and client relationships.

In 1991 he became vice president of marketing for CBS/FOX, managing a professional and college sports and fitness video business in North America and nine international territories. He managed licensing/joint venture agreements with the NBA, NFL, NHL, NCAA, CBS Sports, NBC Sports and ABC Sports.

In 1995, Conroy joined BMG Entertainment as chief marketing officer and president of new technology. He launched the company’s Internet-related activities, including e-commerce, digital distribution, and the development of new formats such as Enhanced CD and DVD and he identified and created strategic alliances with AOL, American Airlines, American Express, AT&T, Disney, Intel, Microsoft, Sundance, Starbucks, Visa, and Yahoo. He was responsible for the launch of the first ever use of Real Audio with RealNetworks and launched the first ever use of A2B music in partnership with AT&T Labs. Conroy initiated the effort behind BMG Visa negotiating a pact with Wachovia Bank and Visa USA to establish a co-branded credit card giving consumers rewards through a global music company. He negotiated and launched a joint-venture with Universal Records, to create GetMusic, the first content plus commerce model in the space as well as the launch of BMG’s participation in MusicNet, the industry’s first music subscription service.

AOL 
Conroy’s career at AOL started in 2001 as senior vice president/general manager of the company’s music strategy/platforms. In 2002 he took on the role of senior vice president/general manager of AOL Entertainment. In 2003, he became the executive vice president/chief operating officer of AOL Broadband, and in 2005 he took on the role of executive vice president of AOL Products and Marketing.

Conroy was an early-stage contributor to music and video streaming, and has been described as a pioneer, and an innovator and disruptor in the online music, and audio and video industry. In his role as Senior Vice President and General Manager of AOL Music, he built and launched AOL Radio, leveraging AOL’s Spinner Radio and then partnered with CBS Radio to create the then largest online radio platform in the world. He created original programming franchises such as AOL Sessions, and in partnership with major music labels, he launched the first generation of Pandora (then called Savage Beast) on AOL Music as a song search engine, and the first 99 cent downloads. Under his leadership, AOL Music won the first annual MidemNet Innovation Award. As executive vice president for AOL's global products and marketing group, he launched AOL Video and created its first content/programming partnerships with other major broadcast and cable networks.  He worked with Mark Burnett to bring Gold Rush to AOL, a 2006 reality competition hosted by Mark Steines. He was also credited with creating the first digital TV catalogue service, In2TV and establishing the first distribution deal with Hulu on AOL.

Univision 
Conroy joined Univision in 2009 and held several titles through to 2016: he was head of corporate marketing, research and insights teams, president of digital, president of enterprise development, and chief strategy and data officer. He led the development of Univision's video strategy, designed video infrastructure, re-built content management system, and launched the first bilingual digital video network. During this period, he was a board member of the Interactive Advertising Bureau and Digital Content Next.

He led efforts with the CEOs of Nielsen, comScore and Rentrak to significantly improve the accuracy and quality of the media measurement of US Hispanics across all media platforms. As a result, he created the first Univision Tracking Study and created an online community to provide real-time research to drive programming sales, marketing, distribution, and business development decision-making.

MGM 
In 2016, Conroy joined Metro-Goldwyn-Mayer as president of digital and new platforms. He led the initiatives for new and emerging platforms and was charged to develop and broaden the studio’s short-form digital content, utilizing MGM’s vast catalogue as well as originally scripted content, beginning with the first new originally scripted content in 10 years, Stargate Command.

Conroy developed partnerships with major content brands for virtual and augmented reality experiences, which included investments in the leading entertainment and gaming VR and location-based entertainment companies, Dreamscape and Survios. He was a strategic member of the team that developed the company's OTT efforts in the areas of faith-based and entertainment verticals, including Lightworkers Media and Stargate Command.

Current roles 
Currently, Conroy is founder and CEO of ConroyCo Ventures, formerly Conroy Media, providing consulting and advisory services to early stage and high-growth new companies. He is also president of 4D Factory, a holding company that invests in technology-driven media transformation. In 2020, 4D Factory acquired majority stake in HBO game publishing spinoff, Neon Media, an Emmy Award-winning startup.

Honors and awards 

 Named in Ad Age'''s "Marketing 100," in June 1998.
One of Digital Media Wire's "25 Executives to Watch" in Digital Entertainment for 2010.
Put on Broadcasting & Cable 2010 List of Digital All-Stars - Broadcasting & Cable News, August 2010.
Honored at Broadcasting & Cable’s Annual Technology Leadership Awards, the 18th Technology Leadership Awards at the Annual NAB Show Event, 2015.
Put on Cablefax Digital Hot List, Cablefax Digital, Tech and Trailer Awards, March 2015.
Gained Membership in the CDO Club Hall of Fame, a list of chief digital officers and chief data officers who became CEO or president since 2011, issued by Bain Capital and CDO Club, July 2016.
 Included in Washington Life magazine's Tech Hall of Fame of Innovators and Disruptors, July 2017.

 Published articles 

 "The Third-Party Cookie Divide is Debilitating the Industry," Ad Age, May 31, 2013

"Audience Measurement Should Be About Total Audience, Total Reach and Total Engagement," Broadcasting & Cable, March 3, 2015

 "Ad Blocking: A Problem in Need of a Creative Solution," Ad Age'', July 28, 2015

References 

American businesspeople

1960 births
Living people